is a JR West Kabe Line station located in Mitakihon-machi, Nishi-ku, Hiroshima, Hiroshima Prefecture, Japan.

Station layout
Mitaki Station features one island platform serving two tracks. There is no station building, and access to the station is via a railway crossing that connects directly to the road. The station is unmanned and features an automated ticket machine.

Platforms

History
1909-11-19: Mitaki Station opened
1987-04-01: Japanese National Railways is privatized, and Mitaki Station becomes a JR West station

Surrounding area
 National Route 54
Mitaki-dera
Mitaki Golf Course
Ōta River (太田川)

External links

 JR West

Railway stations in Hiroshima Prefecture
Railway stations in Japan opened in 1909
Kabe Line
Hiroshima City Network
Stations of West Japan Railway Company in Hiroshima city